Dovev is a moshav in northern Israel. Located in the Upper Galilee around 7 km north of Har Meron near Israel's border with Lebanon, it falls under the jurisdiction of Merom HaGalil Regional Council.

History
The moshav was founded in 1958 by immigrants and refugees to Israel from Morocco and Iran on the land of the depopulated Palestinian Arab village of Kafr Bir'im, northwest of the village site. It was named after David Bloch-Blumenfeld (Dovev is an acronym of his initials), one of the leaders of the Labor Movement in the land of Israel, who was a mayor of Tel Aviv. East of the moshav is a nature reserve, the pond of Dovev.

Most residents of Dovev were evacuated due to safety concerns during the 1982 Lebanon War and again in Operation Grapes of Wrath in 1996. In 2006, four Katyusha rockets landed on the outskirts of the moshav, damaging fruit trees.

See also
Baram National Park

References

External links
Dovev Bet-Alon 

Moshavim
Populated places established in 1963
Populated places in Northern District (Israel)
1963 establishments in Israel
Iranian-Jewish culture in Israel
Moroccan-Jewish culture in Israel